The Africa Zone was the unique zone within Group 3 of the regional Davis Cup competition in 2021. The zone's competition was held in round robin format in Cairo, Egypt, from 11 to 14 August 2021.

Participating nations

Withdrawn nations

Draw
Date: 11–18 August 2021

Location: Smash Tennis Academy, Cairo, Egypt (clay)

Format: Round-robin basis. Two pools – one of four teams and one of three teams – and nations will play each team once in their group. Nations finishing in the top two of each group will play-off for promotion, with the winner of Group A facing the runner-up of Group B, and the winner of Group B facing the runner-up of Group A.

The two teams finishing third in their groups will enter a relegation play-off, with the beaten team joining the team finishing fourth in contesting Africa Group IV in 2022.

Seeding

 1Davis Cup Rankings as of 8 March 2021

Round Robin

Pool A

Pool B

Standings are determined by: 1. number of wins; 2. number of matches; 3. in two-team ties, head-to-head records; 4. in three-team ties, (a) percentage of sets won (head-to-head records if two teams remain tied), then (b) percentage of games won (head-to-head records if two teams remain tied), then (c) Davis Cup rankings.

Playoffs

Round Robin

Pool A

Egypt vs. Benin

Algeria vs. Benin

Egypt vs. Algeria

Pool B

Kenya vs. Rwanda

Mozambique vs. Ghana

Kenya vs. Mozambique

Ghana vs. Rwanda

Kenya vs. Ghana

Mozambique vs. Rwanda

Play-offs

Promotional play-offs

Egypt vs. Mozambique

Kenya vs. Benin

Relegation play-off

Algeria vs. Rwanda

Final placements 

References

External links
Official Website

Davis Cup Europe/Africa Zone
Africa Zone